Lothar Wolfgang Nordheim (November 7, 1899, Munich – October 5, 1985, La Jolla, California) was a German born Jewish American theoretical physicist.  He was a pioneer in the applications of quantum mechanics to solid-state problems, such as thermionic emission, work function of metals, field electron emission, rectification in metal-semiconductor contacts and electrical resistance in metals and alloys. He also worked in the mathematical foundations of quantum mechanics, cosmic rays and in nuclear physics.

Life 
He obtained his PhD in 1923, under the supervision of Max Born in the University of Göttingen. He also worked with Edward Teller on the muon, sparkling his interest in cosmic rays.

As a "physical assistant" to David Hilbert (like his teacher Born before him), he worked with him John von Neumann and Eugene Wigner on the mathematical formulation of quantum mechanics in 1928. 

He wrote extensive articles for the Lehrbuch der Physik by J.H.J. Müller and Claude Pouillet on the quantum theory of magnetism and the conduction phenomena in metals.  During the same period was the holder of a Rockefeller Foundation Research Fellowship, a Lorentz Fellowship. He lectured at Göttingen and was also a visiting professor at the University of Moscow.

In the early 1930s he got interested in Fermi's theory of beta decay and worked with Hans Bethe on meson decay.

Upon his immigration to the United States in 1934 Nordheim served as a Visiting Professor at Purdue University, working on cosmic rays, moving on to a permanent faculty position at Duke University in 1937. 

He married German physicist Gertrud Pöschl in 1935, and together worked on structure and spectra of polyatomic molecules.

During the World War II, he worked as a member of the Manhattan Project as head of department in the Clinton Laboratories in Oak Ridge and from 1945 to 1947 head of the physics department there. 

His wife died in accident during a stay in Germany in 1935, Nordheim was deeply affected. He later decided to move to California. In 1956 he became a scientist at the John L. Hopkins Laboratory of Pure and Applied Science of General Atomics in San Diego and later chairman of the theoretical physics department. There he mainly dealt with the physics of nuclear reactors and neutron physics. In the early 1950s, however, he also made early contributions to the nuclear shell model with Maria Goeppert Mayer.

He was elected in 1936 a Fellow of the American Physical Society. In 1951 he received the honorary degree of Doctor in Science from the Karlsruhe Institute of Technology and 1963 from Purdue University. He was also the first to give the Fritz London Memorial Lecture at Duke University in 1956.

Field electron emission
An important contribution, with the British physicist Ralph H. Fowler in 1928, was to establish the correct physical explanation of the physical phenomenon now called field electron emission. They established that electron emission occurred by a form of wave-mechanical tunneling, now called Fowler–Nordheim tunneling, and, with the help of the assumption that electrons in metals obeyed Fermi-Dirac statistics, derived an (approximate) emission equation. Over time, this equation has been developed into a family of approximate equations (offering different degrees of approximation to reality, when describing field emission from bulk metals), known as Fowler–Nordheim-type equations.

Fowler-Nordheim tunneling was the first effect in physics to be firmly identified as due to wave-mechanical tunneling, in the early days of quantum mechanics. The original Fowler-Nordheim-type equation was one of the first to use Fermi-Dirac statistics to explain an experimental phenomenon involving electrons in metals, and its success greatly helped to establish modern electron band theory. The Fowler-Nordheim paper also established the physical basis for a unified treatment of field-induced and thermally induced electron emission.

The ideas of J. Robert Oppenheimer, Fowler and Nordheim were also an important stimulus to the development, by George Gamow, and Ronald W. Gurney and Edward Condon, later in 1928, for the theory of the radioactive decay of nuclei (by alpha particle tunneling).

References

Notes

20th-century German physicists
20th-century American physicists
1899 births
1985 deaths
University of Göttingen alumni
Duke University faculty
Theoretical physicists
Jewish emigrants from Nazi Germany to the United States
Jewish physicists
Fellows of the American Physical Society